The All-American Hockey League (AAHL) was a minor professional hockey league formed in 1986 after the Continental Hockey League (CnHL) ceased operations. The league was created by the CnHL teams Danville, Dayton, and Troy adding the Downriver Stars and the Jackson All-Americans. In 1987, the AAHL absorbed the two remaining teams from Atlantic Coast Hockey League. After a single season in the AAHL, Carolina, Johnstown, and Virginia left the league to form the East Coast Hockey League. The AAHL only lasted one more season and folded after the 1988–89 season.

Teams

AAHL teams
 Carolina Thunderbirds (1987–88) – left league to become a founding team in the ECHL.
 Danville Fighting Saints (1986–89) – ceased operations after the 1988–89 AAHL season
 Dayton Jets (1986–87) – merged with Troy Sabres to form Miami Valley Sabres
 Downriver Stars (1986–87) – became Michigan Stars the following season; folded due to bankruptcy during 1987–88 AAHL season after 14 games.
 Jackson All-Americans (1986–89) – ceased operations after the 1988–89 season
 Johnstown Chiefs (1987–88) – left league to become a founding team in the ECHL
 Lincoln Park Patriots (1988–89) – ceased operations after the 1988–89 AAHL season
 Miami Valley Sabres (1987–89) – ceased operations after the 1988–89 AAHL season
 Port Huron Clippers (1987–88) – folded after the 1987–88 regular season
 Troy Sabres (1986–87) – merged with Dayton Jets to form Miami Valley Sabres
 Virginia Lancers (1987–88) – left league to become a founding team in the ECHL
 Springfield Capitols (1988–89) – ceased operations after the 1988–89 AAHL season

Season standings

1986–87 season

1987–88 season

1988–89 season

Leaders

Goals

Points

* - stats incomplete

References

See also
List of ice hockey leagues

 
Defunct ice hockey leagues in the United States